Sam Morgan (December 18, 1887 – February 25, 1936) was an American New Orleans-based jazz trumpet player and bandleader.

He was born in Bertrandville, Louisiana, United States. Sidemen in the band included brothers Isaiah and Andrew Morgan on trumpet and tenor sax, respectively, Earl Fouché on alto sax and Jim Robinson on trombone. Robinson's cousin Sidney Brown (aka Little Jim or Jim Little) was the bassist, and George Guesnon was Morgan's banjoist from 1930 to 1935. The "Young Morgan Band" as it was commonly called by fans of the day, was one of the most popular territory bands touring the Gulf Coast circuit (Galveston, Texas to Pensacola, Florida).

Sam Morgan died in New Orleans in February 1936, at the age of 48.

Reissues
Columbia Special Products, a division of Columbia Records, produced in 1964 a three record set, Jazz Odyssey, Volume 1: The Sound of New Orleans (1917–1947).  The music of "Sam Morgan's Jazz Band", recorded in 1927 with Morgan on cornet, comprised all of the sixth side. The tracks were: "Steppin' on the Gas"; "Everybody's Talkin'"; "Mobile Stomp"; "Sing On"; "Short Dress Gal"; "Bogalusa Strut"; "Down by the Riverside"; and "Over in Gloryland". These eight 78rpm sides are Morgan's entire recorded legacy.

Further reading
 Joyce, Jr., John J., Bruce Boyd Raeburn, and Anthony M. Cummings, eds. (2012). Sam Morgan's Jazz Band: Complete Recorded Works in Transcription. Music of the United States of America (MUSA) vol. 24. Madison, Wisconsin: A-R Editions.

References

External links
 Sam Morgan Jazz Band audio of 1927 records on Red Hot Jazz Archive.
 Sam Morgan's Jazz Band at Music of the United States of America (MUSA)

1887 births
1936 deaths
Jazz musicians from New Orleans
American jazz bandleaders
American jazz trumpeters
American male trumpeters
20th-century American conductors (music)
20th-century trumpeters
20th-century American male musicians
American male jazz musicians